Noureddine Ould Ali (born 23 June 1972) is an Algerian football coach who was most recently the manager of the Palestine national football team.

Early life
Ould Ali was born in Bab El Oued, a suburb of the capital of Algiers, Algeria on 23 June 1972. Ould Ali played football in the town of Aïn Bénian, before attending university.

Coaching career
In 1992, Ould Ali began coaching US Chaouia under-20s. Following a spell at Chaouia, Ould Ali moved to France to coach at Marseille-based club US Rouet. At Rouet, Ould Ali met former France international François Bracci. After leaving Rouet, Ould Ali followed Bracci to Algeria, becoming assistant manager under Bracci at CS Constantine and MC Alger. In 2013, Ould Ali moved to USM Alger, becoming assistant to Rolland Courbis.

In 2018, having been assistant to former manager Abdel Nasser Barakat, Ould Ali succeeded Julio César Baldivieso as manager of Palestine. He first began coaching work with the Palestinian national team in 2010, and by 2018 he had spent more than five years with them.

He led Palestine in the country's second Asian Cup appearance, where Palestine was eliminated without scoring a goal and only two points obtained. Then, he led the Palestinians to the 2022 World Cup qualification, where the Palestinians managed to create a shock home win over Uzbekistan 2–0, leaving enthusiasm among Palestinians. Yet, after the historic win, the team suffered two denting defeats to Singapore and Yemen, before letting the Uzbeks take vengeance on away ground. Due to the performance of Palestine in the qualification, Ould Ali suffered criticism from Palestinian football platform.

Managerial statistics

References

1972 births
Living people
Algerian footballers
Footballers from Algiers
Algerian emigrants to France
Expatriate football managers in the State of Palestine
Palestine national football team managers
Association footballers not categorized by position
2019 AFC Asian Cup managers
Algerian football managers
Algerian expatriate sportspeople in the State of Palestine